American Idiot: The Original Broadway Cast Recording is an album by the cast of American Idiot and Green Day. In September 2009, American Idiot began its run in the Berkeley Repertory Theatre, California. After two extensions, it was transferred to the St. James Theatre on Broadway. The first single from the album, "21 Guns" was released on December 3, 2009. The album also includes "When It's Time", a previously unreleased song written by Billie Joe Armstrong. Two versions of it appear on the album, one by The Cast and one by Green Day. It was originally released on mtv.com on April 13, 2010 and was released on CD on April 20, 2010. A vinyl version of the album was released on July 13, 2010. The album debuted at number 43 on the Billboard 200, becoming one of the highest-charting musical soundtracks. The album won Best Musical Show Album at the 53rd Annual Grammy Awards. Shortly after the album's release, another album featuring 13 songs from the album was released as American Idiot: Selections from the Original Broadway Cast Recording.

Track listing

Tracks are split into two discs, although there is no mention of this on the sleeve as tracks are written consecutively as tracks 1 to 22. Despite being the curtain call of the show, "Good Riddance (Time of Your Life)" is not featured on the album.

American Idiot: Selections from the Original Broadway Cast Recording
"American Idiot" - 3:05
"Holiday" - 4:07
"Boulevard of Broken Dreams" - 4:22
"St. Jimmy" - 2:46
"Give Me Novacaine" - 3:33
"Last of the American Girls/She's a Rebel" - 2:22
"Last Night on Earth" - 4:16
"21 Guns" - 4:45
"Letterbomb" - 3:24
"Wake Me Up When September Ends" - 4:46
"Homecoming"I. "The Death of St. Jimmy"II. "East 12th St."III. "Nobody Likes You"IV. "Rock and Roll Girlfriend"V. "We're Coming Home Again" - 9:39
"Whatsername" - 4:05
"When It's Time" (Green Day version) - 3:23

Reception

Personnel

Musicians
Band
 Billie Joe Armstrong – vocals, guitar, piano
 Mike Dirnt – bass
 Tré Cool – drums, percussion
 Tom Kitt - arrangements, orchestration
 Carmel Dean - piano, synthesizer, accordion
 Kathy Marshall - violin
 Erin Benim - viola
 Rachel Turner Houk - cello
 Trey Files - percussion
 Alec Berlin; John Gallagher Jr.; Michael Esper; Stark Sands; Joshua Henry; Gerard Canonico - guitar

Musical cast
Main parts
 John Gallagher Jr. (Johnny)
 Michael Esper (Will)
 Stark Sands (Tunny)
 Tony Vincent (St. Jimmy/Jimmy)
 Rebecca Naomi Jones (Whatsername)
 Mary Faber (Heather)
 Christina Sajous (The Extraordinary Girl)
 Joshua Henry (Favorite Son)
 Theo Stockman (The Representative of Jingletown/ "Too Much Too Soon" Male Soloist)
 Alysha Umphress ("Too Much Too Soon" Female Soloist)

Ensemble
 Declan Bennett
 Andrew Call
 Gerard Canonico
 Miguel Cervantes
 Van Hughes
 Brian Charles Johnson
 Joshua Kobak
 Lorin Latarro
 Omar Lopez-Cepero
 Leslie McDonel
 Chase Peacock
 Ben Thompson
 Alysha Umphress
 Aspen Vincent
 Libby Winters

Crew
Production
 Billie Joe Armstrong - producer
 Michael Mayer - director
 Chris Lord-Alge – mixing engineer
 Adam Fair - additional engineering
 Chris Dugan – engineer
 Brad Kobylczak – additional engineering
 Ian Shea; Lee Bothwick; Denny Muller – assistant engineers
 Ted Jensen – mastering

Artwork
 Chris Bilheimer – art design
 Doug Hamilton; Kevin Berne – photography

Chart positions

See also
 American Idiot (musical)

References

External links
 Broadway Musical Official website
 Green Day Official website

2010 soundtrack albums
Cast recordings
Green Day
Theatre soundtracks
American Idiot
Albums recorded at Electric Lady Studios
Grammy Award for Best Musical Theater Album